North West Staffordshire was a constituency in Staffordshire which returned one Member of Parliament (MP)  to the House of Commons of the Parliament of the United Kingdom. Elections were held using the first past the post voting system.

History
The constituency was created for the 1885 general election, and abolished for the 1918 general election.

Members of Parliament

Election results

Elections in the 1880s 

Leveson-Gower was appointed Lord Commissioner of the Treasury, requiring a by-election.

Elections in the 1890s

Elections in the 1900s

Elections in the 1910s 

General Election 1914–15:

Another General Election was required to take place before the end of 1915. The political parties had been making preparations for an election to take place and by the July 1914, the following candidates had been selected; 
Labour: Albert Stanley
Unionist:

References

Parliamentary constituencies in Staffordshire (historic)
Constituencies of the Parliament of the United Kingdom established in 1885
Constituencies of the Parliament of the United Kingdom disestablished in 1918